Tropical Storm Rachel  may refer to:

In the Eastern Pacific Ocean 
 Tropical Storm Rachel (1984) - Moderate tropical storm, no effect on land
 Tropical Storm Rachel (1990) - Strong tropical storm, made landfall in Mexico twice, caused 18 deaths
 Hurricane Rachel (2014) - Category 1 hurricane, no effect on land

Western Pacific Ocean 
 Tropical Storm Rachel (1999) - Minimal tropical storm; stuck Taiwan, regenerated, before dissipating over the Yellow Sea

Southwest Pacific Ocean 
 Cyclone Rachel (1997) - Category 1-equivalent tropical cyclone that struck Port Hedland at peak intensity

Pacific hurricane set index articles
Pacific typhoon set index articles
Australian region cyclone set index articles